Ashcroft (2016 population: 1,558) is a village in the Thompson Country of the Interior of British Columbia, Canada.

Ashcroft's downtown is on the east side of the Thompson River, although the municipal boundaries straddle the river, with housing and the town's hospital and recreation complex on the west bank. It is something of a "twin" to nearby Cache Creek, which unlike Ashcroft is on the major highway.

History
Ashcroft was named after the nearby Ashcroft Manor on Ashcroft Ranch founded in the 1860s, during the Cariboo Gold Rush, by two English brothers named Clement Francis Cornwall and Henry Pennant Cornwall, who emigrated to Canada from Ashcroft, at Newington Bagpath in Gloucestershire. The brothers had originally come in search of gold; however, on hearing stories from failed gold searchers they decided to found the town to give future gold searchers a place to saddle their horses. They sold flour to packers and miners, helping to make the community. The Cariboo Road ran nearby but on the west bank of the Thompson River.

Ashcroft was a major stop for trains, where mining supplies were dropped off.

The Canadian Pacific Railway reached Ashcroft in 1884 and the town became a division point and service centre for the rail line. The province built a bridge across the river in 1890 so travellers could ride the train to Ashcroft then board a stagecoach for a journey north. In 1920, when the Pacific Great Eastern Railway (now BC Rail) was partially built, running from Squamish to Clinton and Williams Lake, Ashcroft lost strategic importance as a supply centre and transit point for the north. After this, the townsfolk started to rely on farming to sustain the community. Despite being dry, farming was very successful because of water from the Thompson River and hot sun. During the 1920s the small but successful Chinese community made money by testing the growing of potatoes and tomatoes. A tomato cannery was built in the village, which later closed in 1957.

In 2001, Ashcroft expanded its boundaries to include the Ashcroft Ranch, which had been bought in 2000 by the Greater Vancouver Regional District (GVRD) with the intent of using it as the site of a landfill to succeed the Cache Creek sanitary landfill. In 2011, however, the British Columbia government denied an environmental assessment certificate for the landfill, and Metro Vancouver expressed a desire to divest itself of the property.

Geography
The geography in and around Ashcroft resembles that of desert terrain, due to the near desert conditions in lower elevation areas and has been marketed as sets for the film industry. A number of old west films and movies depicting the middle east have used this area as a stand in.

Climate
Ashcroft has a dry semi-arid climate (Köppen climate classification BSk). Ashcroft is frequently one of the hottest places in BC in the summer and has the second highest temperature ever recorded in Canada. It also has short, moderate winters with light snowfall. Parts of Ashcroft along the Thompson River gorge are sufficiently arid to be classified as a pocket desert; this microclimate forms the only true desert in Canada.

Demographics 

Religion 
According to the 2021 census, religious groups in Ashcroft included:
Irreligion (1,000 persons or 61.9%)
Christianity (590 persons or 36.5%)

Transportation and communication
Ashcroft town is not on the Fraser Canyon Highway, rather it sits on the east bank of the river below the bench. The highway runs from Spences Bridge to Cache Creek, and there is a turnoff at the Ashcroft Ranch for a separate road that goes into town.
As a flag stop Via Rail's The Canadian calls at the Ashcroft railway station three times per week in each direction.

Ashcroft is served by a community television station (run by the Ash-Creek Television Society), CH4472 on VHF channel 4 (with an effective radiated power of 74 watts at 15 meters above ground level), with a repeater (CH4473 on VHF 8, with an effective radiated power of 49 watts at 45 meters) in the neighbouring town of Cache Creek.

Attractions
Ashcroft was home to the Nl'akapxm Eagle Motorplex, a ¼-mile IHRA-sanctioned dragstrip, which opened in 1987 and closed in April 2016.

Ashcroft had its first annual Wellness Festival in July 2013.

Sister city
The Japanese town of Bifuka, in Hokkaido, was twinned with Ashcroft in 1994. Tourism between Ashcroft and Bifuka residents is common.

Television and film
Projects that have been filmed in the area include
 Sky High (1989 Disney film)
 Cadence (1990)
 Bird on a Wire (1990)
 The X-Files (1993 TV series) 
 Double Cross (1994)
 Zacharia Farted (1998)
 Eyes of a Cowboy (1998 TV mini-series)
 The Pick-up (1999 short film)
 Lola (2001)
 Flower & Garnet (2002)
 Traffic (2004 mini-series)
 The Sisterhood of the Traveling Pants (2005)
 An Unfinished Life
 Miss Texas (2005 TV movie)
 Partition (2007)
 Centigrade (2007 short film)
 Shooter (2007)
 Joyride 2: Dead Ahead (2008)
 The Andromeda Strain (2008 mini-series)
 2012 (2009)
 Alien Trespass (2009)
 Rain Down (2010)
 Thirst (2010)
 The A-Team (2010)
 Flicka 2 (2010)
 Afghan Luke (2011)
 The Walk (2013 short film)
 The X-Files (2016 TV Series), Episode: "My Struggle"
 Tomato Red (2016)
 Fosters Beer commercial
 Ford Car commercial
 Gold Trails and Ghost Towns, Season 3, Episode 9
 The Twilight Zone (2020)

References

External links

Villages in British Columbia
Populated places in the Thompson-Nicola Regional District
Thompson Country